Concord Production Inc. was a production company founded in 1972 in Hong Kong (british) by Bruce Lee and Raymond Chow (50%). Lee was in charge of the creative decisions and Chow was in charge of the administration. The Golden Harvest was in charge of the distribution. The Lee Estate owns 51% of Concord Films, the other 49% belonging to Raymond Chow. Concord has the following in its library: 1–Way of the Dragon, 2–50% of Enter the Dragon, 3–Game of Death footage. Raymond and the Estate agree to settle up for a flat fee buy out. Raymond buys the 51% of Concord. After Lee's death, Linda Lee Cadwell, his wife, sold his portion to Chow in 1976. Concord went defunct in 1976. Raymond Chow went on to continue running Golden Harvest.

Productions 
 The Way of the Dragon (1972) with Golden Harvest
 The Game of Death (1972 – original footage) with Golden Harvest; unfinished because of Bruce Lee's death (An article on this subject in simple English is also available)
 Enter the Dragon (1973) with Warner Bros.
 Bruce Lee: the Man and the Legend (1973) with Golden Harvest

References

External links 
 Concord Production Inc. at the Hong Kong Cinemagic
 Concord Production Inc. at IMDb

1971 establishments in Hong Kong
1976 disestablishments in Hong Kong
Mass media companies established in 1971
Mass media companies disestablished in 1976
Film production companies of Hong Kong
Bruce Lee